Come Together is a studio album by Ike & Tina Turner and their backing vocalists the Ikettes, released on Liberty Records in May 1970.

Content and release 
Following Ike & Tina Turner's tour with the Rolling Stones in November 1969, the duo began incorporating rock songs into their repertoire. Due to the receptive public response of their live performances, a studio version of the Beatles' "Come Together" was released on Minit Records in December 1969. It peaked at No. 57 on the Billboard Hot 100 and No. 21 on the Billboard Soul Singles chart. Due to the success of the single, they were promoted to Minit's parent label, the more mainstream Liberty Records. Their second single, "I Want to Take You Higher" by Sly and the Family Stone was released in May 1970. It peaked at No. 34 on the Billboard Hot 100 and No. 25 on the Billboard Soul Singles chart.

The track "Evil Man" was originally recorded as "Evil Woman" by the band Crow, more famously remembered for the version Black Sabbath released in January 1970. Ike & Tina Turner's recording is gender swapped, describing a man rather than a woman.

The album peaked at No. 13 on the Billboard Soul LP's chart and at No. 130 on the Top LP's chart.

Critical reception 

Reviewing the album in Christgau's Record Guide: Rock Albums of the Seventies (1981), Robert Christgau wrote:Tina is more convincing when she's growling out Ike's songs about her sexual appetites (I sure couldn't handle her) than when she's belting out Ike's songs about the social fabric ("Why can't we be happy like we used to be") ... And the rock covers take some strain off Ike — especially when Tina sings a Beatles song that's about both her sexual appetites and the social fabric.

Reissues 
Come Together was digitally remastered and released by BGO records on the compilation CD Come Together/Nuff Said in 2010.

Track listing 
All tracks written by Ike Turner, except where noted.

Chart performance

References 

1970 albums
Ike & Tina Turner albums
Albums produced by Ike Turner
Liberty Records albums